The Fraser Mansion is a building at 1701 20th Street NW, at the intersection of Connecticut Avenue, 20th Street, and R Street in the Dupont Circle neighborhood of Washington, D.C.  Since its construction in 1890, the mansion has served as a private residence, a restaurant, a boarding house, the home of the Founding Church of Scientology, and—currently—the location of Scientology's National Affairs office.

The mansion was listed on the National Register of Historic Places in 1975.

Design, construction, and early use 
The mansion was designed by the architectural firm of Hornblower and Marshall in an early eclectic beaux arts style to serve as the home of New York merchant George S. Fraser.  The building is three stories tall with two basement levels and an attic. It is constructed of red brick and pink granite with a colonnaded entrance porch with balustraded deck, and a tiled, hipped roof.  The interior was planned around a central open stair, with large, central halls on each floor.  It was constructed in 1890 at a cost of $75,000, more than ten times the cost of a typical Washington home at that time.

The building served as Fraser's residence until his death in 1896.  In 1901, Fraser's widow sold the mansion to Pennsylvania Congressman Joseph Earlston Thropp, where he took up residence beginning on March 3, 1901.  The Thropps made exterior alterations, enlarging dormer windows and adding an oriel window in 1901.  In 1905, architects Totten and Rogers designed a terrace with an entrance to the house near the oriel window, and also redesigned the garden wall.

The mansion remained in the ownership of Thropp and his wife, Miriam Scott-Thropp, until Scott-Thropp's death in 1930.

Restaurant 
In 1932, the lower floor of the mansion began operation as the Parrot Tea Room, a tea house, with a boarding house located on the upper levels.  In 1950, upon leasing to John Goldstein, the facility was converted to a restaurant and renamed the Golden Parrot.  The mansion was sold in 1974, and the restaurant was renamed the Golden Booeymonger.  Later, the mansion became home to nightclubs Larry Brown's and Sagittarius.

The mansion was again sold in 1981 to Walter Sommer for $2 million.  In 1982, following a $3 million restoration/renovation, the Fourways fine dining restaurant on the first floor and the Bermuda Bar and Grill below it were opened. The Fourways served Continental European and American dishes under the leadership of chef Jacques Barre.

By 1988, Sommer opened the Bermuda Bar and Grill patio-cafe alongside the Fourways.  According to the Nation's Restaurant News, the restaurant seated 40 people inside and 60 outside, and was modeled after the Fourways Restaurant and Inn of Bermuda.  Among other things, the restaurant featured an all-you-can-eat salad bar, an unlimited Sunday brunch, and "traditional Bermuda drink, Dark & Stormy,  made with Bermuda's Gosling's Black Seal Rum and Ginger Beer. Another Bermudian tradition, Bermuda fish chowder with Outerbridge's Original Sherry Peppers Sauce was always on the menu.

Proposed apartment building 
In 1987, Sommer proposed to construct a seven-story, 29-unit apartment building in its parking lot behind the mansion.  At the time, the property was zoned residential, with variances permitting a restaurant on the property.  Then-owner Walter Sommer claimed that the variances restricted him unfairly, requiring him to go to the zoning board multiple times for changes to his business, in a process that he considered costly and time consuming.  Additionally, Sommer claimed that without commercial zoning, he was unable to obtain a "realistic commercial loan" to fund maintenance costs.  Between 1982 and 1987, the D.C. Board of Zoning Appeals granted Sommer variances to expand the commercial use of the building above the first floor permitting a private business club on the second floor. The club never opened. The third floor was an apartment for the General Manager.

While the proposed design for the building was approved by the D.C. Office of Planning and the Historic Preservation Review Board, and the Department of Public Works had determined that the plans, which would have included underground parking for both the apartments and the restaurant, would not cause an increase in parking or traffic problems in the area, the community opposed the building's construction.  Nearby resident Duff Gilfont described the proposed apartment building as "such a blight to this area," and that "there would have been so many people inconvenienced by it."  Several neighborhood associations opposed rezoning the building, expressing concern that the new building would be used as a hotel.  Sommer denied that there were plans to use the building as a hotel or an office building.

Several covenants were proposed.  One would require that the new building only be used for residential purposes.  A second would have required that any future owners of the Fraser Mansion would be required to submit their plans for the building for review by the D.C. Historic Preservation Review Board.  A third proposed covenant would have split the zoning of the property, allowing only residential use of the building, but requiring variances for any changes in the parking for the restaurant or the apartment building.

Despite the proposed covenants, however, community groups vowed to continue to fight the proposal.

Bankruptcy and attempted sale 
During the fight over the building's zoning, Sommer claimed that he would go bankrupt if he was unable to develop the property.  Fourways filed for Chapter 11 bankruptcy in 1989, and by October 1989, the Fourways restaurant had closed.

Trying to pay creditors, Sommer attempted to sell the mansion.  Sommer's initial asking price was $7 million, which he later reduced to $3 million.  A number of embassies and chanceries looked at the mansion, but none purchased.  According to real estate broker Stanley Holland, Sommer "thought it was worth more than it was."

Church of Scientology 
In 1994, the Church of Scientology purchased the property with the intention of using the building as a church facility.  In purchasing the building, Scientology first purchased mortgages on the building in 1993 from the FDIC, which had assumed the loans after the 1990 failure of the National Bank of Washington.  Following the purchase of the loans, Scientology foreclosed on the building.  In the subsequent foreclosure auction, Scientology purchased the building for $2.7 million.

Following $1 million in renovations, the building was dedicated as the new Founding Church of Scientology on October 21, 1995, by Religious Technology Center chairman David Miscavige.

The Founding Church of Scientology relocated from the Fraser Mansion to the nearby Embassy Building on 16th Street NW on October 31, 2009.  Fraser Mansion now serves as the National Affairs office for the Church of Scientology. The L. Ron Hubbard House, also known as the Original Founding Church of Scientology, is a historic landmark and house museum located nearby.

References

External links 

 

Houses completed in 1890
Beaux-Arts architecture in Washington, D.C.
Restaurants in Washington, D.C.
Defunct restaurants in the United States
Dupont Circle
Houses on the National Register of Historic Places in Washington, D.C.
Scientology properties